Events from the year 1682 in Ireland.

Incumbent
Monarch: Charles II

Events
February 19 – William Sheridan consecrated Bishop of Kilmore and Ardagh in the Church of Ireland.
February 21 – the Eaton Baronetcy of Dunmoylin, County Limerick is created in the Baronetage of Ireland for Simon Eaton.
July 24 – the office of Third Serjeant-at-law at the Irish Bar is created, the first holder being John Lyndon.
September 27 – the King baronetcy of Boyle Abbey in the County of Roscommon is created in the Baronetage of Ireland for Robert King.

Births
James O'Hara, 2nd Baron Tyrawley, Field Marshal in the British Army (d. 1774)
Henry Singleton, judge (d. 1759)
approximate date
Henry Boyle, 1st Earl of Shannon, politician (d. 1764)
John Ussher, soldier and politician (d. 1741)

Deaths
March 29 – Roger Boyle, 2nd Earl of Orrery, politician (b. 1646)
November 28 – Valentine Greatrakes, faith healer (b. 1628)
Sir George Bingham, 2nd Baronet, politician (b. c.1625)

References

 
1680s in Ireland
Ireland
Years of the 17th century in Ireland